The National Assembly of Zambia has 156 single-member constituencies.

Central Province – 15 seats
Bwacha
Chisamba
Chitambo
Kabwe Central
Kapiri Mposhi
Katuba
Keembe
Lufubu
Mkushi North
Mkushi South
Muchinga
Mumbwa
Mwembeshi
Nangoma
Serenje

Copperbelt Province – 22 seats
Bwana Mkubwa
Chifubu
Chililabombwe
Chimwemwe
Chingola
Kabushi
Kafulafuta
Kalulushi
Kamfinsa
Kankoyo
Kantanshi
Kwacha
Luanshya
Lufwanyama
Masaiti
Mpongwe
Mufulira
Nchanga
Ndola Central
Nkana
Roan
Wusakile

Eastern Province – 20 seats
Chadiza
Chama North
Chama South
Chasefu
Chipangali
Chipata Central
Kapoche
Kasenengwa
Kaumbwe
Luangeni
Lumezi
Lundazi
Malambo
Milanzi
Mkaika
Msanzala
Nyimba
Petauke Central
Sinda
Vubwi

Luapula Province – 15 seats
Bahati
Bangweulu
Chembe
Chiengi
Chifunabuli
Chipili
Kawambwa
Luapula
Mambilima
Mansa Central
Milenge
Mwansabombwe
Mwense
Nchelenge
Pambashe

Lusaka Province – 12 seats
Chawama
Chilanga
Chongwe
Feira
Kabwata
Kafue
Kanyama
Lusaka Central
Mandevu
Matero
Munali
Rufunsa

Muchinga Province – 8 seats
Chinsali
Isoka
Kanchibiya
Mafinga
Mfuwe
Mpika Central
Nakonde
Shiwa Ng'andu

Northern Province – 13 seats
Chilubi
Chimbamilonga
Kaputa
Kasama Central
Lubansenshi
Lukashya
Lunte
Lupososhi
Malole
Mbala
Mporokoso
Mpulungu
Senga Hill

North-Western Province – 12 seats
Chavuma
Ikeleng'i
Kabompo
Kasempa
Manyinga
Mufumbwe
Mwililunga
Solwezi Central
Solwezi East
Solwezi West
Zambezi East
Zambezi West

Southern Province – 20 seats
Bweengwa
Chikankata
Chirundu
Choma
Dundumwenzi
Gwembe
Itezhi-Tezhi
Kalomo Central
Katombola
Livingstone
Magoye
Mapatizya
Mazabuka Central
Mbabala
Monze Central
Moomba
Namwala
Pemba
Siavonga
Sinazongwe

Western Province – 19 seats
Kalabo Central
Kaoma Central
Liuwa
Luampa
Luena
Lukulu East
Mangango
Mitete
Mongu Central
Mulobezi
Mwandi
Nalikwanda
Nalolo
Nkeyema
Senanga
Sesheke
Shang'ombo
Sikongo
Sioma

 
Zambia
Parliamentary constituencies